The 2011 United Bowl was the third title game of the Indoor Football League (IFL). It was played on July 16, 2011, at the Sioux Falls Arena in Sioux Falls, South Dakota. The top seed in the United Conference, the Sioux Falls Storm, defeated the fourth-seed Intense Conference champion Tri-Cities Fever, by a score of 37–10.

Road to the United Bowl

United Conference

Intense Conference

y - clinched division title

x - clinched playoff spot

United Bowl
United Bowl
United Bowl
Tri-Cities Fever
Sioux Falls Storm
Sports competitions in South Dakota
United Bowl